Tébar is a municipality located in the province of Cuenca, Castile-La Mancha, Spain. According to the 2004 census (INE), the municipality has a population of 387 inhabitants.

Notable people
 

Luis Tribaldos de Toledo (1558–1636), Spanish humanist, geographer and historian

References

Municipalities in the Province of Cuenca